The 2000–01 season will be Ferencvárosi TC's 99th competitive season, 99th consecutive season in the OTP Bank Liga and 101st year in existence as a football club.

Transfers

Summer 

In:

Out:

Winter 

In:

Out:

Nemzeti Bajnokság I

League table

First stage

Second stage

Results summary

First stage

Second stage

Overall

Results by round

First stage

Second stage

Matches

First stage

Second stage

Hungarian Cup

Group stage

Final stage

Statistics

Appearances and goals
Last updated on 23 June 2001.

|-
|colspan="14"|Out to loan:

|-
|colspan="14"|Players no longer at the club:

|}

Top scorers
Includes all competitive matches. The list is sorted by shirt number when total goals are equal.
Last updated on 23 June 2001.

Disciplinary record
Includes all competitive matches. Players with 1 card or more included only.

Last updated on 23 June 2001.

Overall
{|class="wikitable"
|-
|Games played || 40 (36 NB 1 and 4 Hungarian Cup)
|-
|Games won || 21 (18 NB 1 and 3 Hungarian Cup)
|-
|Games drawn || 11 (11 NB 1 and 0 Hungarian Cup)
|-
|Games lost || 8 (7 NB 1 and 1 Hungarian Cup)
|-
|Goals scored || 73
|-
|Goals conceded || 37
|-
|Goal difference || +36
|-
|Yellow cards || 69
|-
|Red cards || 4
|-
|rowspan="1"|Worst discipline ||  Attila Dragóner (8 , 1 )
|-
|rowspan="1"|Best result || 6–0 (A) v Eger - (Hungarian Cup) - 28-7-2000
|-
|rowspan="3"|Worst result || 2–5 (A) v Dunaferr - (NB 1) - 6-9-2000
|-
| 0–3 (A) v Haladás - (NB 1) - 15-9-2000
|-
| 2–5 (A) v MTK Budapest - (NB 1) - 6-5-2001
|-
|rowspan="1"|Most appearances ||  Gábor Vén (39 appearances)
|-
|rowspan="1"|Top scorer ||  Péter Horváth (17 goals)
|-
|Points || 74/120 (61.66%)
|-

References

External links
 Official Website
 UEFA
 fixtures and results

2000-01
Hungarian football clubs 2000–01 season